Arbanaška may refer to:

 Arbanaška, Trebinje, a village in the municipality of Trebinje, Republika Srpska, Bosnia and Herzegovina
 Arbanaška (Prokuplje), a village in the municipality of Prokuplje, Serbia

or:

 Arbanaška River, a river in the municipality of Prokuplje, Serbia
 Arbanaška Mountain, a mountain in the municipality of Prokuplje, Serbia
 Arbanaško Hill ("Arbanaška Hill"), a hill in the municipality of Prokuplje, Serbia